Hiunchuli is a peak situated in the Annapurna massif of the Gandaki Province in north-central Nepal. The mountain is an extension of the Annapurna South. Between this peak and the Machapuchare is a narrow section of the Modi Khola valley that constitutes the sole access to the Annapurna Sanctuary.

Hiunchuli was first climbed in October 1971 by an expedition led by the U.S. Peace Corps volunteer Craig Anderson. The mountain is classified as a trekking peak by the Nepal Mountaineering Association (NMA), but it is considered one of the more difficult trekking peaks to climb due to route finding difficulties and dangers from rock fall and seracs. A climbing permit from the NMA costs US$350 for a team of up to four members.

Gallery

References

Mountains of the Gandaki Province
Six-thousanders of the Himalayas